István Udvardi (February 27, 1960 – February 6, 2012) was a Hungarian water polo player.

He died three weeks before his 52nd birthday.

See also
 List of Olympic medalists in water polo (men)

References
Elhunyt Udvardi István
Elhunyt Udvardi István
Gyász: Elhunyt Udvardi István
SZEOL AK I.
Ki kicsoda a magyar sportéletben?, III. kötet (S–Z). Szekszárd, Babits Kiadó, 1995, p. 251

External links
 

1960 births
2012 deaths
Hungarian male water polo players
Water polo players at the 1980 Summer Olympics
Olympic water polo players of Hungary
Olympic bronze medalists for Hungary
Olympic medalists in water polo
Water polo players from Budapest
Medalists at the 1980 Summer Olympics
20th-century Hungarian people
21st-century Hungarian people